Rafael Garcia Tonioli Defendi (born 22 December 1983) is a Brazilian footballer who plays as a goalkeeper for Farense in Liga Portugal 2.

Career
Born in Ribeirão Preto, São Paulo, Defendi passed through Botafogo de Futebol e Regatas and Santos F.C. youth systems, in his early career. In 2007, he made his first move abroad and joined C.D. Aves, making his professional debut on 18 August 2007 in a 2–1 home loss against S.C. Olhanense. He only added six league appearances throughout the season before returning to Brazil.

After several years in his home country, mostly at the regional level, in July 2014, Defendi returned to Portugal, joining Paços de Ferreira, being first choice most of the season, battling with António Filipe for the position.

On 9 July 2018, Defendi signed a two-year deal with LigaPro side F.C. Famalicão. He played all but one game in his first season as they finished runners-up and were promoted to the top flight after a 25-year absence; on 3 March 2019 he and Capela were sent off in a 1–1 home draw with FC Porto B.

Personal life
He is the older brother of Rodrigo Defendi, also a professional footballer.

References

External links

1983 births
Living people
People from Ribeirão Preto
Brazilian footballers
Brazilian people of Italian descent
Association football goalkeepers
Esporte Clube Noroeste players
Comercial Futebol Clube (Ribeirão Preto) players
C.D. Aves players
Sertãozinho Futebol Clube players
Mirassol Futebol Clube players
Grêmio Osasco Audax Esporte Clube players
Clube Atlético Bragantino players
F.C. Paços de Ferreira players
F.C. Famalicão players
S.C. Farense players
Primeira Liga players
Liga Portugal 2 players
Brazilian expatriate footballers
Brazilian expatriate sportspeople in Portugal
Expatriate footballers in Portugal
Footballers from São Paulo (state)